BOAC Flight 911 (call sign "Speedbird 911") was a round-the-world flight operated by the British Overseas Airways Corporation (BOAC) that crashed near Mount Fuji in Japan on 5 March 1966, with the loss of all 113 passengers and 11 crew members. The Boeing 707 jetliner involved disintegrated mid-air shortly after departing from Tokyo, as a result of severe clear-air turbulence.

It was the third fatal passenger airline accident in Tokyo in a month, following the crash of All Nippon Airways Flight 60 on 4 February and that of Canadian Pacific Air Lines Flight 402 just the day before.

Flight history
The aircraft (registration  arrived at Tokyo Haneda Airport at 12:40 on the day of the accident from Fukuoka Airport, where it had diverted the previous day due to conditions on the ground in Tokyo. The weather there had since improved behind a cold front with a steep pressure gradient bringing cool dry air from the Asian mainland on a strong west-northwest flow, with crystal-clear sky conditions.

For the next Tokyo–Hong Kong segment, the crew received a weather briefing from a company representative, and filed an instrument flight rules (IFR) flight plan calling for a southbound departure from Haneda via the island of Izu Ōshima, then on airway JG6 to Hong Kong at flight level 310. The Boeing was commanded by Captain Bernard Dobson, 45, from Dorset, described as a very experienced 707 pilot who had been flying the type since 1960.

At 13:42 the crew contacted air traffic control requesting permission to start the engines, and amending their clearance request to a visual meteorological conditions (VMC) climb westbound via the Fuji-Rebel-Kushimoto waypoints, which would take them nearer to Mount Fuji, possibly to give the passengers a better view of the landmark.

The aircraft began taxiing at 13:50 and took off into the northwest wind at 13:58. After takeoff, the aircraft made a continuous climbing right turn over Tokyo Bay, and rolled out on a southwest heading, passing north of Odawara. The aircraft then encountered strong turbulence, causing it to break up in flight and crash into a forest.

Investigation

Analysis of the location of wreckage allowed the accident investigators to determine that the vertical stabiliser attachment to the fuselage failed first. It left paint marks indicating that it broke off the port side horizontal stabiliser as it departed to the left and down. A short time later, the ventral fin and all four engine pylons failed due to a leftward over-stress, shortly followed by the remainder of the empennage. The aircraft then entered a flat spin, with the forward fuselage section and the outer starboard wing breaking off shortly before impact with the ground.

An 8 mm film exposed by one of the passengers was recovered from the wreckage. It showed pictures of the Tanzawa Mountains and Lake Yamanaka, followed by two empty frames and then apparently images of the aircraft's interior, before ending abruptly. Tests suggested that the two empty frames may have been the result of structural loads of up to 7.5 g momentarily jamming the camera's feeding mechanism.

Although some stress cracking was found in the vertical stabiliser bolt holes, it was determined by subsequent testing that it did not contribute to the structural failure. Still, it was potentially a significant flight safety issue. Subsequent inspections on Boeing 707 and similar Boeing 720 aircraft as a result of this discovery did reveal this was a common problem, and corrective maintenance actions on the fleet eventually followed.

One day after the crash, speculation was that fierce winds above Mount Fuji were responsible. The New York Times wrote that, despite initial reports of fire and explosion, aviation experts were of the opinion that wind conditions around the volcanic cone may have caused the crash, the vicinity of the peak being notorious for its difficult air currents. The violent forces exerted by the turbulent air could have caused structural failure of one of the engines, leading to a subsequent fire.

The investigation report concluded that the aircraft crashed as a result of its encounter with "abnormally severe turbulence over Gotemba City which imposed a gust load considerably in excess of the design limit." It also stated "it is not unreasonable to assume that, on the day of the accident, powerful mountain waves existed in the lee of Mt Fuji, as in the case of mountain waves formed by extended ridges, and that the breakdown of the waves resulted in small-scale turbulence, the intensity of which might have become severe or extreme in a short period of time."

Surrounding circumstances
This accident was one of five fatal aircraft disasters—four commercial and one military—in Japan in 1966 and occurred less than 24 hours after Canadian Pacific Airlines Flight 402 crashed and burned on landing at Haneda. Film footage shows Flight 911 taxi-ing past the still smouldering wreckage of Flight 402 immediately before taking off for the last time.

The victims included a group of 75 Americans associated with the Thermo King company of Minneapolis, Minnesota, on a two-week company-sponsored tour of Japan and Southeast Asia. There were 26 couples travelling together in the group, and a total of 63 children were orphaned as a result of the accident.

Several booked passengers cancelled their tickets at the last moment to see a ninja demonstration. These passengers, Albert R. Broccoli, Harry Saltzman, Ken Adam, Lewis Gilbert, and Freddie Young, were in Japan scouting locations for the fifth James Bond film, You Only Live Twice (1967).

References

Notes

Bibliography

 (Newspaper archive: page A-1  page A-3 )

External links

Picture of the aircraft that carried BOAC Flight 911
Pilotfriend.Com – Article about BOAC Flight 911
Plane crash info – BOAC Flight 911 entry

Aviation accidents and incidents in 1966
Aviation accidents and incidents in Japan
1966 in Japan
Airliner accidents and incidents caused by in-flight structural failure
Accidents and incidents involving the Boeing 707
Flight 911
March 1966 events in Asia